The 1975–76 Irish Cup was the 96th edition of the premier knock-out cup competition in Northern Irish football. 

Carrick Rangers won the cup for the 1st time, defeating Linfield 2–1 in the final at the The Oval and becoming only the third (and to the date, the most recent) non-senior side to win the cup.

The holders Coleraine were eliminated in the quarter-finals by Carrick.

Results

First round

|}

Replay

|}

Quarter-finals

|}

Replay

|}

Second replay

|}

Semi-finals

|}

Replay

|}

Final

References

External links
The Rec.Sport.Soccer Statistics Foundation - Northern Ireland - Cup Finals

Irish Cup seasons
1975–76 in Northern Ireland association football
1975–76 domestic association football cups